2007 World Cup may refer to:

 Alpine skiing: 2007 Alpine Skiing World Cup
 American football: 2007 IFAF World Cup in Japan
 Baseball: 2007 Baseball World Cup in Taiwan
 Biathlon: 2007 Biathlon World Cup
 Bobsleigh: 2007 Bobsleigh World Cup
 Cricket: 2007 Cricket World Cup hosted by the West Indies
 Cricket: ICC World Twenty20 hosted by South Africa
 Cross-country skiing: 2006-2007 Cross-Country Skiing World Cup
 Cycling (track): 2007 UCI Track Cycling World Cup Classics
 Cyclo-cross: 2006/07 UCI Cyclo-cross World Cup
 Football (soccer): 2007 FIFA Club World Cup in Japan
 Football (soccer): 2007 FIFA U-17 World Cup in South Korea
 Football (soccer): 2007 FIFA U-20 World Cup in Canada
 Football (soccer): 2007 FIFA Women's World Cup in China
 Freestyle skiing: 2007 Freestyle Skiing World Cup
 Golf: 2007 Omega Mission Hills World Cup
 Luge: 2007 Luge World Cup
 Nordic combined: 2007 Nordic Combined World Cup
 Rugby Union: 2007 Rugby World Cup in France
 Short track: 2007 Short Track Speed Skating World Cup
 Skeleton: 2007 Skeleton World Cup
 Ski jumping: 2007 Ski Jumping World Cup
 Snowboarding: 2007 Snowboarding World Cup
 Speed skating: 2007 Speed Skating World Cup
 Speedway: 2007 Speedway World Cup
 Volleyball: 2007 FIVB Women's World Cup

See also
 2007 World Championships (disambiguation)
 2007 World Junior Championships (disambiguation)
 2007 Continental Championships (disambiguation)